Rhododendron edgeworthii, the Edgeworth rhododendron, is a species of flowering plant in the genus Rhododendron native to the eastern Himalaya, south-central China, Tibet, and Myanmar. It has gained the Royal Horticultural Society's Award of Garden Merit.

References

edgeworthii
Plants described in 1851